Kokers Films is an Indian film production and distribution company founded and headed by Siyad Koker. Koodum Thedi (1985) was the first film to be produced by them. The company has produced 15 films since 1985.

Filmography

References 

Mass media companies established in 1985
Film production companies of Kerala
1985 establishments in Kerala
Indian companies established in 1985